Khabra is a surname. Notable people with the surname include:

Ajay Khabra (born 1995), Canadian soccer player and coach
Harmanjot Khabra (born 1988), Indian footballer
Piara Khabra (1921–2007), British–Indian politician

Indian surnames